Leslie Mynard (19 December 1925 – 25 July 2008) was an English footballer who appeared in the Football League for Wolverhampton Wanderers, Derby County and Scunthorpe United.

Mynard joined Wolverhampton Wanderers in 1945, from non-league side Bewdley. He made his debut on 7 February 1948 in a 2–1 win over Huddersfield, the first of three consecutive starts for the winger. However, these proved his only taste of first team action at Molineux and he moved to Derby County in May 1949.

He found playing time equally scare at his new club though and made just 14 appearances in three years. He moved to Third Division Scunthorpe and Lindsey United for the 1952-53 season before dropping into the non-league. He finished his playing career with spells at Worcester City, Halesowen Town, Bromsgrove Rovers and Kidderminster Harriers, respectively.

He died on 25 July 2008, aged 82.

References
 

1925 births
2008 deaths
People from Bewdley
English footballers
English Football League players
Wolverhampton Wanderers F.C. players
Derby County F.C. players
Scunthorpe United F.C. players
Worcester City F.C. players
Halesowen Town F.C. players
Bromsgrove Rovers F.C. players
Kidderminster Harriers F.C. players
Association football wingers
Sportspeople from Worcestershire